{{DISPLAYTITLE:Nu2 Sagittarii}}

Nu2 Sagittarii (ν2 Sagittarii) is a binary star system in the zodiac constellation of Sagittarius. It is faintly visible to the naked eye, having an apparent visual magnitude of +4.98; it is 0.16 degree north of the ecliptic. The annual parallax shift of 11.91 mas as seen from Earth, indicates this system is roughly 270 light years from the Sun.

The spectrum of the primary component displays a stellar classification of K1 Ib–II, indicating this is a K-type star with a mixed luminosity class of an evolved bright giant/supergiant star. It is a mild barium star, showing an enhanced abundance of s-process elements in its outer atmosphere. This material was most likely acquired during a previous mass transfer from its now white dwarf companion. The primary has an estimated 1.4 times the mass of the Sun and has expanded to 85 times the Sun's radius.

References

K-type bright giants
K-type supergiants
Barium stars
Runaway stars
Sagittarii, Nu
Sagittarius (constellation)
Durchmusterung objects
Sagittarii, 35
175190
092845
7120